The Bangladesh Institute of Law and International Affairs (BILIA) was established in Bangladesh as a government-funded think tank on various affairs of law and foreign policy. A future president of Bangladesh, Abdus Sattar, served as its chairman from 1974 to 1975.

History
Bangladesh Institute of Law and International Affairs traces its origins to the Pakistan Institute of Law and International Affairs. After the Bangladesh Liberation war in 1971, the organisation renamed itself to Bangladesh Institute of Law and International Affairs in 1972. It is a think tank that carries out scholarly research into law and international affairs.

References

1973 establishments in Bangladesh
Bangladeshi research organisations
Think tanks based in Bangladesh
Organisations based in Dhaka
Research institutes in Bangladesh